Cheltenham Ladies' College is a private boarding and day school for girls aged 11 to 18 in Cheltenham, Gloucestershire, England. Consistently ranked as one of the top all-girls' schools nationally, the school was established in 1853 to provide "a sound academic education for girls". It is also a member of the Headmasters' and Headmistresses' Conference.

The school badge depicts two pigeons, taken from the Cheltenham town coat of arms, above three stars, which are in turn above a daisy, a school symbol.

In 2020, Cheltenham Ladies' College was named Southwest Independent School of the Decade by The Times and The Sunday Times.

History
The school was founded in 1853 after six individuals, including the Principal and Vice-Principal of Cheltenham College and four other men, decided to create a girls' school that would be similar to Cheltenham College. On 13 February 1854, the first 82 pupils began attending the school, with Annie Procter serving as the school's Principal. In 1858, upon Procter resigning from her position, the Principal's post was taken by Dorothea Beale, a prominent suffragist educator. who later founded St Hilda's College, Oxford. She was commemorated by a Cheltenham Civic Society blue plaque in 2017. In 1998, it was announced that sixth-form girls at the school would be allowed to wear trousers for the first time.

Structure and academic results
The school is divided into three divisions, Lower College (KS3), Upper College (KS4) and Sixth Form College (KS5). The school gives pupils a choice in what they study. A range of subject combinations is available to Upper College girls at GCSE, and for Sixth Form girls at A-level or International Baccalaureate (IB). Tutors are full-time academic members of staff and advise girls on matters relating to their academic work and progress, while the Professional Guidance Centre gives advice on career options and university applications. Most pupils go on to continue higher education.

The school's academic results are high, both compared to the national average and within the independent sector. From 2014 to 2017, the school reported that over two thirds of A-level results and approximately 90% of GCSE results were A* or A grades. Since 2015, the school has been the top girls boarding school in the country for IB results for three consecutive years. In 2019, 71% of students scored A*/A for their A-level examinations awhile 90% scored A*/A for GCSE.

Members of an alumnae association of over 9,000 former pupils, across 80 different countries, keep in contact and offer work placements and careers advice.

According to Vicky Tuck, the school's Principal in 2011, the school's pupils succeed in "chemistry, physics, economics and maths".

Houses

The school is made up of around 80% boarders and 20% day girls. Whether boarders or day girls, pupils are part of a junior or senior house and are supervised by a Housemistress and a team of House Staff.

Girls who board live in one of eleven boarding houses. There are six junior houses for 11- to 16-year-olds, and five senior houses for sixth form girls. The junior houses are Farnley Lodge, Glenlee, Sidney Lodge, St. Austin's, St. Helen's, and St. Margaret's.  At Sixth Form, all girls move to a senior house. The senior houses are Beale, Cambray, Elizabeth, Roderic and St. Hilda's. Each house is run by a housemistress and several resident staff. The housemistresses have a lighter teaching load with a full-time commitment supervising their boarders.

Junior day girls have their own base in Eversleigh, where the three junior houses, Bellairs, Glengar and St Clare, are located. The senior day girl house, Bayshill, is situated in the main college site.

Co-curriculars
Over 160 co-curricular activities are available.

Music and Drama

The Music and Drama departments offer productions and concerts each year involving all age groups. Over 1,000 individual instrumental lessons take place each week.

In October 2009, Sir Richard Eyre opened the school's new drama building, The Parabola Arts Centre (PAC). The building was built by Foster Wilson Architects and cost over £12.5 million, funded by donations. The school is a major sponsor of the Cheltenham Music, Literature, Jazz and Science Festivals and events are hosted at the centre annually. The PAC building was awarded the RIBA award. In 2010, Sharman Macdonald (Keira Knightley's mother) was commissioned to write the college's play. In 2016, the school also invested in a new recording studio.

Sports
In 2018, the school opened a new Health and Fitness Centre.

Sports facilities include a 25-metre six-lane swimming-pool, netball courts, tennis courts, squash courts, AstroTurf fields, lacrosse pitches, a spin studio, two dance studios and two sports halls.

Over 30 sports are offered, and students are encouraged to maintain their fitness and wellbeing through physical exercise. The main sports are Netball, Lacrosse and Hockey in the winter, and Tennis, Swimming and Athletics in the Summer. The school also has a well-established Rowing Club, and Equestrian and Ski teams.

Admissions
The school is one of the hardest UK private schools to get into, with competition for places at sixth form being "fierce". Entry to Cheltenham Ladies' College is by examination for girls aged 11+, 13+ and 16+ (Sixth Form), as well as occasionally at 12+ and 14+ where only a few students are admitted.

Inspections
The school was last inspected by the Independent Schools Inspectorate in October 2014. It achieved the grade "Excellent" in all areas.

In the Financial Times''' secondary school ranking, Cheltenham Ladies College was placed at no. 14 in 2010 and no. 34 in 2011. The college was the top girls boarding school and 6th overall in UK rankings for the International Baccalaureate Diploma in 2017.

The Tatler School Guide 2018 notes that "confident, resilient, clever girls flourish" at the college. The Good Schools Guide described the school as "a top flight school with strong traditional values and a clear sense of purpose. For the bright and energetic all rounder this school offers an exceptional education that is both broad and deep, with endless opportunities for fun and enrichment along the way."

In 2020, Cheltenham Ladies' College was named South West Independent Secondary School of the Decade by The Times and The Sunday Times. The awards, published in the "Parent Power" schools guide, commend schools that have achieved academic excellence and provided an outstanding education over the previous decade.

 In popular culture 
As one of the oldest and most prestigious all-girls' boarding schools in the UK, the school has often been referred to as "the girls' Eton". However, the school has worked hard to play down this reputation.

BBC Four made a three-part documentary series titled My New Best Friend to emphasize the importance and nature of friendship among children. The first episode tracked the journey of four young girls starting at Cheltenham Ladies' College.

Cheltenham Ladies' College is mentioned in the film St Trinian's (2007) as the previous school of the main character.

 List of Principals 

 Annie Proctor, 1854–1858
 Dorothea Beale, 1858–1906 
 Lilian Faithfull, 1906–1922
 Beatrice Sparks, 1922–1937
 Margaret Popham, 1937–1953
 Joan Tredgold, 1953–1964
 Margaret Hampshire, 1964–1979
 Joan Sadler, 1979–1987
 Enid Castle, 1987–1996
 Vicky Tuck, 1996–2011
 Gwen Byrom, 2011 (Acting)
 Eve Jardine-Young, 2011–present

 Notable staff 

 Winifred Lily Boys-Smith (1865–1939)
 U. A. Fanthorpe (1929–2009), poet
 Charlotte Laurie (1856–1933), botanist
 Eleanor Mary Reid (1860–1953), palaeobotanist
 Mary Watson (1856–1933), chemist
Gustav Holst (1874–1934), composer
Agnes Tschetschulin (1859-1942), composer and violinist

Notable pupils

Guild is the association of College's former pupils.

The arts

Florence Farr, actress and mistress of George Bernard Shaw
Bridget Riley, artist
Sophie Solomon, violinist
Dame Kristin Scott Thomas, actress
Serena Scott Thomas, actress
Katharine Hamnett, fashion designer
Damaris Hayman, actress
Cherry Healey, television presenter
Judith Ledeboer, architect and housing reformer
Leyly Matine-Daftary, modernist painter
Charlotte Reather, comedy writer and actress
Talulah Riley, actress
Amanda Wakeley, fashion designer

Politics, law and civil service

Violet Brooke-Hunt, community organizer and volunteer in Boer War
Elizabeth Gass, Lady Gass, Lord Lieutenant of Somerset since 1998
Dame Cheryl Gillan, Conservative Member of Parliament and former Secretary of State for Wales
Sally Keeble, Labour Member of Parliament
Lizzy Lind af Hageby, speaker and writer antivivisection and feminism
Rachel Lomax, the first woman Deputy Governor of the Bank of England
Fiona Mactaggart, Labour Member of Parliament
Cicely Mayhew, UK's first female diplomat
Gareth Peirce, defence lawyer
Amber Rudd, former Home Secretary 
Liz Shore, former Deputy Chief Medical Officer
Catherine Williamson, Canterbury's first woman mayor & Irish politician

Sciences, technology, engineering

Mary Archer, scientist and chair of the trustees of the Science Museum Group
Prue Barron, surgeon
Louisa Aldrich-Blake, first female Master of Surgery 
Mary Collins, immunologist
Maud Cunnington, archaeologist
Miriam Violet Griffith, electrical engineer, technical author and pioneer of ground source heat pumps
Lillias Hamilton, doctor and author
Constance Leathart, Air Transport Auxiliary pilot in Second World War, first woman in Britain to design and fly a glider
Margaret Lowenfeld, paediatrician and child psychotherapist
Dame Clare Marx, first female President of the Royal College of Surgeons (2014-2017), Chair of the General Medical Council (January 2019)
Helen Mackay, first female Fellow of the Royal College of Physicians
Liz Miller, former neurosurgeon and mental health campaigner
Jennie Pryce, quantitative geneticist
Frances Ritchie, nurse
Lucy Wills, haematologist
Helena Rosa Wright (née Lowenfeld), doctor and pioneer of family planning
Nur Amalina Che Bakri, Doctor

Journalism and authors

Hilary Andersson, journalist and presenter
Phyllis Bentley, novelist and authority on the Brontë family
Theodora Bosanquet, writer, reviewer, editor, amanuensis to Henry James, director and literary editor of Time and Tide (magazine). 
Rosie Boycott, journalist and former editor of The Independent and the Daily Express''
D. K. Broster, novelist
Katharine Burdekin, author
Amy Key Clarke, mystical poet, author and senior teacher at the school, also wrote histories of the school
Janet E. Courtney, writer
Tatiana Hambro, fashion writer and editor for Moda Operandi
Beatrice Harraden, writer and suffragette 
Phoebe Hesketh, poet
Lisa Jardine, historian, author and broadcaster 
Margaret Kennedy, novelist
Sue Lloyd-Roberts, television journalist
Kate Reardon, journalist
Betty Ridley, journalist
Mira Sethi, journalist
May Sinclair, writer
Caroline Spurgeon, literary critic
Robin Stevens, children's author
Jenny Uglow, biographer
Margaret Winifred Vowles, author
Sarah Wardle, poet
Grace Wyndham Goldie, first Head of BBC News & Current Affairs

Sports

Nina Clarkin, World number one female polo player
Poppy Cooksey, Olympic fencer
Mary Eyre, England hockey player and Wimbledon umpire
Muriel Robb, Wimbledon Champion and only person to win all national UK tennis singles titles
Jean Westwood, world champion ice dancer

Other

Annette Bear-Crawford, suffragette
Tamara Beckwith, socialite
Mary Russell, Duchess of Bedford, 11th Duchess of Bedford
Mary Boyce, scholar of Zoroastrianism
Victoria Davies Randle, a socialite of Victorian Lagos, Nigeria, who served as Queen Victoria's goddaughter
Dame Helen Gwynne-Vaughan, Commandant of the Women's Royal Air Force and Chief Controller of the Auxiliary Territorial Service
 Dorothy Christian Hare, medical director of the Women's Royal Naval Service
Jane Ellen Harrison, classical scholar
Hermione Hobhouse, historian
Nicola Horlick, investment fund manager (ran away)
Beatrice Irwin (aka Alice Beatrice Simpson), actress, poet and illumination designer entrepreneur
Eve Jardine-Young, Principal of Cheltenham Ladies' College
Raja Zarith Sofiah, consort of the King of Johor, Malaysia
Agnes Royden, preacher and suffragette
Anne Willan, Founder of École de Cuisine La Varenne (Paris, Burgundy & Los Angeles)

References

External links
Cheltenham Ladies' College Official website.
Profile on the Independent Schools Council website

Educational institutions established in 1853
Girls' schools in Gloucestershire
Private schools in Gloucestershire
Schools in Cheltenham
International Baccalaureate schools in England
1853 establishments in England
Boarding schools in Gloucestershire
Member schools of the Girls' Schools Association